The 22nd British Academy Film Awards, given by the British Academy of Film and Television Arts in 1969, honored the best films of 1968.

Winners and nominees

Statistics

See also
 41st Academy Awards
 21st Directors Guild of America Awards
 26th Golden Globe Awards
 21st Writers Guild of America Awards

Film022
1968 film awards
1969 in British cinema